Insight Publicis is an advertising agency operating in Nigeria and West Africa. It is wholly owned by the Troyka Group. The company was affiliated with the Grey Group EMEA for several years, but is now a member of the Publicis Group.

In Nigeria, Insight pioneered the integrated marketing communications approach, a management concept that ensures all communication channels work as part of a whole.

History
Insight Publicis was incorporated in 1979 and commenced operations in 1980 as an integrated marketing communications group. The company was co-founded by Biodun Shobanjo, who served as the chairman of Troyka, and Jimi Awosika, the managing director and CEO.mBiodun Shobanjo was the CEO of Insight for 25 years before stepping down at the end of December 2004.

In 2015, the director of strategy and planning, Feyi Olubodun, was promoted to the role of General Manager and COO. Feyi was later elevated from the position of general manager and Chief Operating Officer to Managing Director and Chief Executive Officer of Insight Publicis on 1 October 2016.

Feyi Olubodun resigned as the third Managing Director/CEO in the history of the company in December 2018, and was replaced by Dr. Tendai Mhizha. Mhizha became the first female Managing Director/CEO of the company.

Sinmisola Hughes was appointed to be the Creative Director of Insight Publicis in January 2017. Hughes became the first woman to hold the position that was later moved on to Leo Burnett Lagos (a sister agency within the Troyka Group) as Creative Director in March 2018. The next Creative Director at Insight Publicis was Chuka Obi.

Awards
Both Biodun Shobanjo and Jimi Awosika are the recipients of several local and international awards. In 2013, the Sun newspapers honoured the chairman of Troyka, Biodun Shobanjo, with the ‘Advertising Man of All Times’, their highest award so far, in recognition of his contribution to advertising profession in Nigeria. In 2013, the World Confederation of Businesses (WORLDCOB) USA honoured the agency with the BIZZ 2013 Award for Excellence. In 2012, Insight came tops at the annual advertising awards in Nigeria carting away 25 medals in total. Insight emerged at the biggest winner also at the 2013 LAIF awards carting away the bulk of the awards.

In 2015, Jimi Awosika, one of the legends of advertising on the continent, bagged the award of "Outstanding Advertising Personality of the Decade". Also in 2015, Biodun Shobanjo received the Manager of the Year award at the International Achievements Forum held by the Europe Business Assembly (EBA), which sells "fake awards", at the Institute of Directors, Pall Mall, London, UK.

LAIF - Nigeria's advertising awards
At the Lagos Advertising and Ideas Festival (LAIF), widely considered to be the "Cannes" of Nigeria, Insight has won numerous medals and awards. Notably, in 2012, 2013, and 2014, Insight was the most awarded agency.

Best Place to Work in Nigeria
In 2013, Insight was voted as one of the top 100 places to work in Nigeria by Jobberman, a Nigerian job-hunting website. Insight was the only advertising agency that featured on the list. Later, a 2015 survey conducted by Jobberman in partnership with Ventures Africa voted Insight as the third-best place to work in Nigeria for millennials.

Services
Insight Publicis operates as a fully integrated marketing communications agency. Insight offers the following services : Strategy and Planning, Multimedia Creative Solutions, Brand Development, Digital Marketing, Brand Consultancy, Digital Content Creation and general creative services.

References

External links
Insight Publicis official site
Grey EMEA

Marketing companies of Nigeria
Marketing companies established in 1979
Companies based in Lagos
Nigerian companies established in 1979